Kungsbron (Swedish: "King's Bridge") is a double bridge in central Stockholm, Sweden. Stretching over Klara Sjö, it connects Norrmalm to Kungsholmen.

History 
In 1881, an old wooden bridge spanning Klara sjö ("Lake Klara") was replaced by a 10,7 metres wide steel swing bridge, hand-driven until electricity in 1906 made operation of the bridge three times faster.

A steel two-hinged arch bridge with a single span of 42 metres was added in 1907 stretching over the older bridge. This second bridge was repaired in 1930-1933 and 1952–1953.

The swing bridge was replaced in 1944 by two one-way concrete arch bridges, each 14 metres wide with a maximum span of 68 metres.

The bridge(s) forms the continuation of Kungsgatan ("The King Street"), which was given its name in 1881, most likely chosen because it crosses Drottninggatan ("The Queen Street").

Gallery

See also 
 List of bridges in Stockholm
 Stadshusbron
 Klarabergsviadukten
 Barnhusbron
 Sankt Eriksbron

References

External links 
 faktabanken.nu - Virtual walk over Kungsbron

Bridges in Stockholm